Saint André (French for Saint Andrew) can refer to:

Places

Belgium 
Saint-André, Wallonia, a district of the municipality of Dalhem, province of Liège

Canada

New Brunswick 
Saint-André, New Brunswick
Saint-André Parish, New Brunswick

Quebec 
Saint-André-Avellin, Quebec
Saint-André-d'Argenteuil, Quebec
Saint-André-de-Kamouraska, Quebec
Saint-André-de-Restigouche, Quebec
Saint-André-du-Lac-Saint-Jean, Quebec

France

Simple names
Saint-André, Gers, in the Gers  département
Saint-André, Haute-Garonne, in the Haute-Garonne département
Saint-André, Pyrénées-Orientales, in the Pyrénées-Orientales  département
Saint-André, Savoie, in the Savoie  département
Saint-André, Tarn, in the Tarn département

Compound names
Cléry-Saint-André, in the Loiret  département
Saint-André-Capcèze, in the Lozère  département
Saint-André-d'Allas, in the Dordogne  département 
Saint-André-d'Apchon, in the Loire  département 
Saint-André-d'Embrun, in the Hautes-Alpes  département 
Saint-André-de-Bâgé, in the Ain  département
Saint-André-de-Boëge, in the Haute-Savoie  département 
Saint-André-de-Bohon, in the Manche  département
Saint-André-de-Briouze, in the Orne  département 
Saint-André-de-Buèges, in the Hérault  département 
Saint-André-de-Chalencon, in the Haute-Loire  département 
Saint-André-de-Corcy, in the Ain  département 
Saint-André-de-Cruzières, in the Ardèche  département 
Saint-André-de-Cubzac, in the Gironde  département 
Saint-André-de-Double, in the Dordogne  département 
Saint-André-de-l'Épine, in the Manche  département
Saint-André-de-l'Eure, in the Eure  département
Saint-André-de-la-Marche, in the Maine-et-Loire  département 
Saint-André-de-la-Roche, in the Alpes-Maritimes  département 
Saint-André-de-Lancize, in the Lozère  département 
Saint-André-de-Lidon, in the Charente-Maritime  département 
Saint-André-de-Majencoules, in the Gard  département 
Saint-André-de-Messei, in the Orne  département 
Saint-André-de-Najac, in the Aveyron  département 
Saint-André-de-Roquelongue, in the Aude  département
Saint-André-de-Roquepertuis, in the Gard  département 
Saint-André-de-Rosans, in the Hautes-Alpes  département 
Saint-André-de-Sangonis, in the Hérault  département 
Saint-André-des-Eaux, Côtes-d'Armor, in the Côtes-d'Armor  département 
Saint-André-des-Eaux, Loire-Atlantique, in the Loire-Atlantique département
Saint-André-les-Alpes, in the Alpes-de-Haute-Provence département
Saint-André-lez-Lille, a commune in Lille Métropole
Gare de Saint-André, a railway station in Saint-André-lez-Lille

Réunion 

Saint-André, Réunion

Other usages 
 Saint André Bessette, a Canadian canonized in October 2010
Saint-André cheese, French cheese